M road may refer to:
 Motorways:
 Motorways in Hungary
 Motorways in the United Kingdom
 Motorways in the Republic of Ireland
 M road in Australia are primary roads
 M roads in Malaysia are road in Melaka
 M road in the USA  may refer to
 List of state trunklines in Michigan
 Corridor M, part of the Appalachian Development Highway System
 M roads in Ukraine are international highways
 M roads in Zambia
 M roads in Zimbabwe